Austrorossia australis, often called the big bottom bobtail squid, is a species of bobtail squid in the family Sepiolidae. This species lives in sandy and muddy environments from 131 to 665 meters deep, in waters away from South Australia, New South Wales, Victoria, Tasmania, and Queensland.

Description and spawning 
Its coloring is pinkish to a purple brown coloring, the dorsal mantle is not fused with the head, and it has fins that are wide and short. It has a length of 3.4 cm for males, and 6.3 for females. Female A. australis lay their eggs in small clusters and then leave them unattended, and they may spawn several times in a year.

Conservation 
Its only threat is its being harvested, and it has minor fishery interests. It has no need for any conservation measures, and has been placed as "Least Concern" by the IUCN Red List.

References 

Molluscs described in 1918
Cephalopods of Australia
Taxa named by Samuel Stillman Berry